Jelačići may refer to:
 Jelačići, Jablanica, Bosnia and Herzegovina
 Jelačići, Kladanj, Bosnia and Herzegovina
 Jelačići (Trnovo), Bosnia and Herzegovina
 Jelačići (Višegrad), Bosnia and Herzegovina

See also 
 Jelačić, a surname